Founded by artists, the Boca Raton Museum of Art was established in 1950 as the Art Guild of Boca Raton. The organization has grown to encompass an Art School, Guild, Store, and Museum with permanent collections of contemporary art, photography, non-western art, glass, and sculpture, as well as a diverse selection of special exhibitions. The museum is located at 501 Plaza Real, Boca Raton, Florida in Mizner Park.

About
The Boca Museum of Art features an assortment of traveling exhibitions and permanent collections from established and rising artists including works of art by a number of the great masters. It offers educational programs, artist lectures, films, classes for children, and events. The museums see more than 200,000 patrons annually, making it a major cultural institution in Boca Raton and the surrounding area. The museum promotes sketching in the galleries and even provides clipboards, sketchbooks, and pencils at the front desk. The Boca Raton Museum of Art is a Blue Star museum, meaning it offers free admission to active duty military and their families between Memorial Day and Labor Day. The museum is accredited by the American Alliance of Museums. A newsletter titled "Muse" is published bi-annually and is available for download on the museum's website.

Permanent Collection
19th- and 20th-century European and American painting, drawings and sculpture
The Dr. & Mrs. John J. Mayers Collection of Modern Masters (including Degas, Matisse, Modigliani, Picasso, Seurat and others)
After Minimalism: Abstract Sculpture from the 1970s and 1980s
The Art of Artifacts of West Africa
The Jean and David Colker Collection of Pre-Columbian art and Selections from the Photography Collection
Sculpture Gardens Collections. More than 30 sculptures are featured at the museum and the art school*

Artists in the collection

 Arman
 Samuel Bak
 Will Barnet
 Jennifer Bartlett
 Georg Baselitz
 Leonard Baskin
 Rudolf Bauer
 George Bellows
 Isabel Bishop
 Oscar Florianus Bluemner
 Ilya Bolotowsky
 Graciela Rodo Boulanger
 Stanley Boxer
 Georges Braque
 Jack Bush
 Alexander Calder
 Anthony Caro
 Leonora Carrington
 Lynn Chadwick
 Marc Chagall
 John Chamberlain
 Mihail Chemiakin
 Jules Chéret
 Sandro Chia
 Judy Chicago
 Dale Chihuly
 Dan Christensen
 Christo and Jeanne-Claude
 Chryssa
 Howard Chandler Christy
 Chuck Close
 George Cohen
 John Constable
 Lovis Corinth
 Guillaume Cornelis van Beverloo
 Bill Crawford
 Carlos Cruz-Díez
 José Luis Cuevas
 Allan D'Arcangelo
 Haydn Llewellyn Davies
 Arthur Bowen Davies
 Gene Davis
 Stuart Davis
 Adolf Dehn
 Elaine de Kooning
 Sonia Delaunay
 Charles Demuth
 Lesley Dill
 Jim Dine
 Stevan Dohanos
 Enrico Donati
 Roland Dorcely
 Jean Dubuffet
 William R. Dunlap
 Albrecht Dürer
 Edouard Duval-Carrié
 Friedel Dzubas
 Fred Ellis
 Jimmy Ernst
 Max Ernst
 Erté
 M. C. Escher
 Richard Estes
 Lyonel Feininger
 Georges de Feure
 Ernest Fiene
 Leonor Fini
 Eric Fischl
 Audrey Flack
 Jean-Michel Folon
 Sam Francis
 William Glackens
 Nancy Graves
 Cleve Gray
 Stephen Greene
 Al Held
 John Raymond Henry
 Jasper Johns
 Wolf Kahn
 Alex Katz
 Leon Kroll
 Yasuo Kuniyoshi
 Ronnie Landfield
 John Levee
 Pat Lipsky
 Conrad Marca-Relli
 John Marin
 Knox Martin
 John Matos
 Reuben Nakian
 Robert Natkin
 Louise Nevelson
 Costantino Nivola
 Guy Pene du Bois
 Richard Pousette-Dart
 Maurice Prendergast
 Paul Reed
 I. Rice Pereira
 Betye Saar
 Italo Scanga
 Jacques Soisson
 Julian Stanczak
 Akio Takamori
 Jacques Villon
 Jerry Weiss
 Adja Yunkers

Gallery

The Art School
The Boca Raton Museum of Art offers multiple classes through its art school, the museum's teaching branch. The art school is located at the museum's original Palmetto Park Road location. There are classes available for both novice and experienced artists. The variety of classes range from photography, to weaving, to ceramics, to jewelry making. A summer art camp for ages five to twelve is also offered.

The Artists' Guild
The guild is an auxiliary of the Boca Raton Museum of Art. It was created by the museum's board of trustees in 1984. The guild holds over twenty exhibitions throughout the year and the proceeds from the art sales go to the museum. The guild is open to both artists and lovers of art.

References

External links

Boca Museum of Art (official website)
"Boca Raton Museum Appoints Irvin Lippman Executive Director", Boca Raton Tribune.
"Celebrating 55 Years - The Boca Raton Museum of Art", Florida History & the Arts, Spring 2006. This article includes a good history of the museum.

Art museums and galleries in Florida
Buildings and structures in Boca Raton, Florida
Museums in Palm Beach County, Florida
Institutions accredited by the American Alliance of Museums
Museums of American art